Mrs. Puff is a fictional character in the Nickelodeon animated television series SpongeBob SquarePants and all three films based on the franchise. Voiced by Mary Jo Catlett, Mrs. Puff debuted in the season one episode "Boating School" on August 7, 1999. Mrs. Puff was created and designed by marine biologist and animator Stephen Hillenburg. He developed the character in response to a request from Nickelodeon that the show star a schoolteacher. Hillenburg did not want to portray SpongeBob SquarePants as a school-age child, so Mrs. Puff was introduced as his driving instructor instead of an elementary school teacher.

Mrs. Puff is SpongeBob's paranoid driving teacher and the owner of the town boating school, which is similar to a driver's education facility. She would like nothing more than to pass SpongeBob, as he is her most dedicated and hard-working student, but he routinely panics when he tries to drive a boat and fails every driving test he takes. His failures often cause crashes that lead to mass destruction and endanger Mrs. Puff. While she tries her best to be friendly and patient with her students, Mrs. Puff finds SpongeBob's unintentional recklessness exasperating. She is the long-standing love interest and girlfriend of Mr. Krabs.

The character has received a positive critical reception and has become well known in popular culture for her distinctive voice and temperamental personality. Catlett received an Annie Award nomination in 2001 for her voice-over work as Mrs. Puff along with Tom Kenny as the title character, making them the first SpongeBob cast members to be nominated for an award. Mrs. Puff is featured regularly in a variety of merchandise, such as plush toys and video games, and has appeared at theme parks and in Toyota commercials.

Role in SpongeBob SquarePants
Mrs. Puff is an anthropomorphic pufferfish, specifically a porcupinefish, who owns the underwater boating school that SpongeBob attends. Despite her efforts, she has been unsuccessful at teaching SpongeBob how to drive a boat. He is her most committed student, and knows the answer to every question on the oral exam, but panics every time he takes the driving part of her course. He often crashes her vehicles and causes town-wide destruction in the process. Mrs. Puff displays the pufferfish's inflation defense mechanism when she is scared or when SpongeBob crashes, akin to a car's airbag deploying.

Mrs. Puff's friendliness toward other characters varies. She sympathizes with the short-tempered Squidward Tentacles, and considers him to be the prime example of an outstandingly good driver. Mrs. Puff also treats Patrick, who has attended her class multiple times, with respect despite his slow-wittedness. Of all the residents of Bikini Bottom, she is closest to SpongeBob. While she normally dreads having to drive with SpongeBob, she often acts as a motherly figure towards him.

A running gag in the series is Mrs. Puff's extensive criminal record. As a result of SpongeBob's reckless driving, he regularly lands Mrs. Puff in jail since she assumes responsibility for his actions. This gag is introduced in "Hall Monitor", when Mrs. Puff is held responsible after SpongeBob inadvertently destroys Bikini Bottom. In "Doing Time", SpongeBob and Patrick attempt to break her out of prison to no avail. It is revealed that she prefers prison to working as a teacher because she does not have to drive with SpongeBob. In "No Free Rides", it is implied that Mrs. Puff once had to move to a new town and start a new school with a new name.

Mrs. Puff was married to another pufferfish named Mr. Puff in the past, but he was captured by humans and turned into a novelty lamp – SpongeBob tells Mr. Krabs that Mrs. Puff does not like to talk about the loss of her husband. Since then, she and Mr. Krabs have pursued a romantic relationship and gone on many dates together. As of the show's tenth season, Mrs. Puff and Mr. Krabs have been dating for sixteen years. Mr. Krabs' love for her is so strong that it can transcend his greed for money. She is one of only two characters, the other being his daughter Pearl, that he cares for more than his riches. He gives her a variety of pet names in the series and in spin-off media. In his review of the third season, Bryan Pope of DVD Verdict examined the two characters' relationship and mistook Mrs. Puff for Krabs' wife.

Character

Creation and design

Mrs. Puff was conceived and designed by series creator Stephen Hillenburg. She was the last of the main SpongeBob characters to be designed, since she was not conceptualized until after Hillenburg had already completed the show bible. The June 2003 issue of Nickelodeon Magazine states that when Hillenburg pitched SpongeBob to Nickelodeon, he "had yet to come up with the idea that Mrs. Puff and SpongeBob would be on an endless quest to get SpongeBob a driver's license". Thus, some early development artwork for the show depicted SpongeBob driving submarine-esque vehicles with ease.

Mrs. Puff's development was sparked by Nickelodeon's request for SpongeBob to attend a school. Nickelodeon executives originally wanted to make SpongeBob a child since their most successful cartoons at the time focused on young, school-age characters. Hillenburg said that the network wanted SpongeBob to be like "Arnold [from Hey Arnold!] under the sea," but he told them, "No, that's not the show." As a compromise, Hillenburg decided to "put him in school - but it would be a [boat] driving school." This allowed him to keep writing SpongeBob as an adult while also using the school as a main plot element. Showrunner Vincent Waller suggested that if the network had creative control over the show, almost every episode would take place at Mrs. Puff's school, not at a variety of locations. The choice to make Mrs. Puff a pufferfish, who inflates into a ball when SpongeBob crashes, was made to evoke the appearance of car airbags. Because she was created late in production, her design incorporates elements of the earlier characters' appearances, such as the same type of skirt as Pearl and the same rounded teeth as Squidward.

The episode "Doing Time" was one of the first to be written specifically from Mrs. Puff's point of view; another early example was season two's "No Free Rides." In his 2013 book The SpongeBob SquarePants Experience, animation historian Jerry Beck argued that the former was the episode that "elevated Mrs. Puff to star status".

Voice
Mrs. Puff is voiced by American actress Mary Jo Catlett, who is known for her live-action roles on television programs from the 1970s such as Diff'rent Strokes and M*A*S*H. As of 2017, voicing Mrs. Puff is Catlett's only regular television role. Catlett described herself as "basically retired" in 2013, since she is good friends with the other SpongeBob cast members, making the SpongeBob recording booth an easy environment that requires less preparation than in-person performances. The About Group's Nancy Basille noted in 2016 that Catlett's "rich, low tones as teacher Mrs. Puff recall other roles she has had," citing Diff'rent Strokes and M*A*S*H as programs where she used a similar voice.

Reception

The character has received positive reactions from critics and fans. Yahoo! News called Mrs. Puff "the most famous driving teacher on the planet." Fashion designer Peter Jensen, who designed a line of sweatshirts inspired by SpongeBob, called Mrs. Puff his "absolute favorite" character in an interview with Women's Wear Daily. In 2004, New York Times chief film critic A. O. Scott named Mrs. Puff as one of his favorite characters on SpongeBob SquarePants, along with Squidward Tentacles and Sandy Cheeks. Mrs. Puff was ranked second on Chilangos list of favorite cartoon teachers. KSL-TV listed Mrs. Puff in their countdown of "13 teachers from pop culture you can't help but love". Andrew Whalen of IBT Media called Mrs. Puff's role in the "Doing Time" episode "a series highlight". The Pittsburgh Post-Gazette reported in 2002 that episodes about Mrs. Puff's Boating School were fan favorites. Scott Lecter of DVD Talk said that Mrs. Puff, Sandy and Squidward "make for some of the biggest laughs in the episodes".

Francis Rizzo of DVD Talk called Mrs. Puff's voice "spot-on" thanks to "the perfectly cast Mary Jo Catlett". Catlett's voice-over work as Mrs. Puff was nominated for a 2001 Annie Award in the category Outstanding Individual Achievement for Voice Acting by a Female Performer in an Animated Television Production. Tom Kenny was nominated at the same ceremony for voicing SpongeBob, making them the first actors to earn an award nomination for their work on the show. Catlett and some other main cast members were also nominated for Best Vocal Ensemble at the 2013 Behind the Voice Actors Awards.

During the controversy surrounding SpongeBob's sexuality, Mrs. Puff's name began to be criticized for supposedly referring to the slang term "puff," a descriptor of gay men that can be derogatory or affectionate. The BBC first noted this in reports of the controversy in 2002 and again in 2004. In a 2005 issue of the Sarasota Herald-Tribune, columnist David Grimes challenged this interpretation, writing, "I do not consider [Mrs. Puff's name] damaging evidence. However, if SpongeBob were receiving lessons from Mr. Puff, that would be an entirely different matter." K. Sobschak of the St. Catharines Standard also denounced the debate, asking, "What is wrong with taking boating lessons from a fish? This is a comedy for kids." The National Expert Commission of Ukraine on the Protection of Public Morality revived the criticism of Mrs. Puff's name in 2012, citing it as one of the reasons for an attempted nationwide ban of the program. Mediaite Editor-in-Chief Andrew Kirell questioned this decision, asking rhetorically,  "What's so offensive there? Well, 'puff' is a term often used to describe a gay man, as if Ukrainian children knew that."

Mrs. Puff's quotes and voice have also become popular with fans and casual viewers. The Sun writer Esther Cepeda humorously referred to Mrs. Puff's catchphrase "Oh, SpongeBob!" as "immortal words" in a 2011 article. Her quote "Oh, Neptune" became part of an Internet meme in 2016. Various memes covered by the comedy websites Smosh and BuzzFeed have featured other quotes from the character. In an interview with San Diego Gay & Lesbian News, the cast of Surprise Surprise (which starred Catlett) mentioned that "not one cast or crew person on the movie let a day [on the set] go by without calling some relative ... and handing their cell phones to Mary Jo [Catlett] to do her best 'Oh noooooooo, SpongeBob, nooooooooooo!'"

In other media

Mrs. Puff has appeared in many types of SpongeBob SquarePants merchandise, including action figures, aquarium ornaments, and video games. Tie-in books have prominently featured the character. Board games based on the show, such as The Game of Life and Bikini Bottom Book of Games, use her schoolhouse as a playing location. In 2007, a Lego construction set based on Mrs. Puff's school was released. SpongeBob's Boating Bash, a 2010 racing video game, centers on Mrs. Puff and takes place at the boating school. Mrs. Puff is a playable character in the Wii version, and acts as a guide for the player in the Nintendo DS game.

Theme parks and events have featured Mrs. Puff, often as a costumed character. She was included on a boating school float as part of Sea World Australia's SpongeBob ParadePants parade, which opened in December 2011. She appeared at Universal Studios Hollywood's "SpongeBob Fan Shellabration" in 2013, and at the 2015 SpongeBob SquarePants 400 in Kansas City. Mrs. Puff also made regular appearances at Nickelodeon Suites Resort and Nickelodeon Universe with Mr. Krabs. A section of the SpongeBob StorePants souvenir shop at the Universal Orlando Resort is modeled after Mrs. Puff's boating school.

In 2011, Mary Jo Catlett provided the voice-over for a road traffic safety commercial hosted by Mrs. Puff. It was produced by Nickelodeon and Toyota as the first in a series of SpongeBob advertisements from the two companies. The 30-second infomercial incorporated clips from the fifth-season episode "Boat Smarts" along with new content. Catlett also sings a track as Mrs. Puff on The Best Day Ever album, titled "Mrs. Puff's Boating School Ad". It was released on September 12, 2006, by Nick Records. Rita Engelmann, who voices Mrs. Puff in the German dub of SpongeBob SquarePants, recorded a single as her character titled "Hinterher! (feat. Mrs. Puff)". The song is a parody of Icona Pop's "I Love It" and was released in 2014 by Sony Music Entertainment. Mrs. Puff is mentioned in the book Shingaling, a 2015 sequel to Wonder.

Mrs. Puff plays a small role in the 2004 film The SpongeBob SquarePants Movie and its 2015 sequel. Her lack of screen time in both movies was criticized. Jessica Walsh of the Reading Eagle felt that the first film was "missing something, since key characters, such as Sandy the Squirrel and Mrs. Puff, make only cameo appearances". Sandie Chen of Common Sense Media wrote that the decision to relegate characters like Mrs. Puff to small roles "won't go over well with some fans". About.com's Nancy Basille considered this the first movie's biggest flaw and asked, "why didn't they use more of Squidward, Mr. Krabs, Gary, Mrs. Puff and all our other favorite secondary characters?" The novelization of the 2004 movie includes additional scenes starring Mrs. Puff and Squidward that were not in the motion picture. Mrs. Puff appears in the 2009 stage adaptation of "The Sponge Who Could Fly", which debuted at the Liverpool Empire Theatre. The 2016 musical based on the series stars Abby C. Smith as Mrs. Puff.

SpongeBob's inability to pass Mrs. Puff's course has been referenced in popular culture. In 2011, ice hockey player Taylor Hall failed his driving test and likened it to SpongeBob's situation at Mrs. Puff's school. The writers of Engadget compared a remote-controlled, underwater camera to the boats in SpongeBob, remarking that Mrs. Puff should call her insurance agent if users channel their "inner SpongeBob while remotely driving the thing". In a satirical 2011 article, writers at The Washington Post pretended to interview SpongeBob about his trouble graduating from Mrs. Puff's boating school.

Notes

References

SpongeBob SquarePants characters
Female characters in animated series
Anthropomorphic fish
Fictional undersea characters
Television characters introduced in 1999
Animated characters introduced in 1999
Fictional schoolteachers
Comedy film characters
Female characters in television